Wayne Darwen is an Australian journalist, television producer and filmmaker best known for his work in the tabloid television genre and as director and star of the film, High There (2015).

Began career as a 17-year-old reporter for a newspaper in Sydney, Australia. He worked internationally as a reporter for titles such as Sydney Daily Mirror, Star magazine and the New York Post, before moving to American television as a producer of tabloid newsmagazine shows like A Current Affair, Hard Copy, Geraldo Rivera’s Now It Can be Told, Strange Universe and Inside Edition.

He received attention for his 1993 series of televised interviews with Son of Sam killer David Berkowitz, in which Berkowitz claimed the murders were the work of a Satanic cult. He appeared as reporter in the  documentary film, Dark Mirror of Magick: The Vassago Millennium Prophecy (2012).

His early television exploits were featured in the 1999 book Tabloid Baby, written by his colleague Burt Kearns.

Natural Born Killers

Darwen inspired the character of newsman Wayne Gale, portrayed by Robert Downey Jr. in Oliver Stone’s film, Natural Born Killers (1994).

In May 2015, Darwen made international news when he responded to Downey's attack on journalists and independent films, telling The New York Posts Page Six: "Junior was a lot more interesting when he was a substance-abusing, suffering artist — brave and silly enough to push the envelope."

High There
Darwen wrote, directed (with Henry Goren), produced and took on the guise of Dave High in the documentary film High There (2015). High There is a nonfiction comedy about the efforts of Darwen and Henry Goren to film the pilot for a marijuana travelogue series on the island of Hawaii. They wind up in various misadventures, while uncovering a Drug Enforcement Administration campaign to control the marijuana trade and to persecute marijuana activist Roger Christie. It is the first leg of a filmic journey that picks up where Darwen's colleague and inspiration Hunter S. Thompson left off.

High There premiered 25 August 2014 at the Action on Film International Film Festival in Monrovia, California.  Darwen was on location in Adelaide at the time, so he appeared at the premiere as a life-size cardboard cut-out.  The film won the Viewers' Choice Award at the first annual Cannabis Film Festival in Humboldt County, California on May 3, 2015. On the heels of several rave reviews, it was released on VOD and Limited Edition DVD by BrinkVision on June 23, 2015.

References

External links

Australian television producers
Australian television journalists
Australian reporters and correspondents
Australian film directors
Journalists from Sydney
Living people
Year of birth missing (living people)